Tony Award for Best Scenic Design in a Play is an award for outstanding set design of a play. The award was first presented in 1960 after the category of Best Scenic Design was divided into Scenic Design in a Play and Scenic Design in a Musical with each genre receiving its own award.   Between 1962 and 2004, the award was re-combined to Best Scenic Design before being split again in 2005.

Winners and nominees

1960s

2000s

2010s

2020s

Award records

Multiple wins
 2 Wins
 Bob Crowley
 Scott Pask

Multiple nominations

 6 Nominations
 Santo Loquasto

 5 Nominations
 John Lee Beatty
 Bob Crowley

 4 Nominations
 Christopher Oram
 Scott Pask
 Michael Yeargan

 3 Nominations
 David Gallo
 Rob Howell
 Beowulf Boritt

 2 Nominations
 Miriam Buether
 Bunny Christie
 Es Devlin
 Jonathan Fensom
 David Hays
 Derek McLane
 Jo Mielziner
 David Rockwell
 Todd Rosenthal
 Jan Versweyveld

See also
 Tony Award for Best Scenic Design in a Musical
 Drama Desk Award for Outstanding Scenic Design of a Play
 Laurence Olivier Award for Best Set Design

External links
Tony Awards Official site
Tony Awards at Internet Broadway database Listing
Tony Awards at broadwayworld.com

Tony Awards
Awards established in 1960
1960 establishments in New York City